The 2010–11 Pachuca season was the 64th professional season of Mexico's top-flight football league. The season is split into two tournaments—the Torneo Apertura and the Torneo Clausura—each with identical formats and each contested by the same eighteen teams. Pachuca will begin their season on July 24, 2010 against América, Pachuca will play their homes games on Saturdays at 7pm local time.

Torneo Apertura

Squad 

 (Captain)

Apertura 2010 results

Regular season

Final phase 

Monterrey advanced due to being the higher seed in the classification phase

Transfers

In

Out

Goalscorers

Regular season statistics

Results summary

Results by round

Torneo Clausura

Squad 

 (Captain)

Clausura 2011 results

Regular season

Goalscorers

Regular season statistics

Results summary

Results by round

References 

2010–11 Primera División de México season
Mexican football clubs 2010–11 season